Mette Lindberg (born 2 December 1983) is a Danish vocalist for psychedelic pop group The Asteroids Galaxy Tour, paired with songwriter/producer Lars Iversen. The band has produced three studio albums to date, Fruit, Out of Frequency, and Bring Us Together. She appeared as a judge on the ninth season of the Danish Version of The X Factor. She mentored the 15-to-22-year-olds category. Lindberg had two acts in the final, Reem Hamze and Alex Benson, but they finished as runner-up and third placer, respectively, after the competition was won by Embrace.

References

External links 
The Asteroids Galaxy Tour website
The Asteroids Galaxy Tour Myspace page

1983 births
Danish pop singers
Living people
21st-century Danish women  singers